Stig Örjan Andersson (born 1 May 1943) is a retired Swedish race walker. He took part in the 20 km and 50 km events at the 1968 Summer Olympics, and placed 21st and 13th, respectively. He continued competing at the European and world level in the 1970s, but with little success.

References

1943 births
Living people
Athletes (track and field) at the 1968 Summer Olympics
Olympic athletes of Sweden
Swedish male racewalkers
People from Motala Municipality
Sportspeople from Östergötland County